The FFSA Academy (formerly known as La Filière, Volant Elf and Auto Sport Academy) was created in 1993 by Elf Aquitaine to promote French drivers at the highest level, in line with its marketing approach and its commitment to Renault in F1. It is located at: Technoparc des 24 Heures, Chemin aux Boeufs, 72100 Le Mans, France.

History
A variety of driving schools and motorsport talent searches operated across France throughout the 1970s and 1980s, and were all eventually merged to create the Auto Sport Academy in 1993. It was taken over in April 2001 by the FFSA (Fédération Française du Sport Automobile), becoming one of its subsidiaries.

Its main objective is to train young drivers and promote the best to give them access to a professional career; 40 to 50 drivers are trained every year in its two main disciplines, competition karting (Formula Kart) and single-seater racing (Formula Campus Renault Elf).

Its unique feature is that its concept includes the only motorsport "Pole Espoirs" (promising young drivers' section) in the world.

In effect, until its creation, budding drivers thought that they had to systematically choose between studies and motorsport. The Academy puts the situation in another light: in view of the few successful candidates in motorsport, it offers potential drivers the option of testing their sporting talents while continuing their studies.

It also provides free training for would be mechanics, in partnership with the State Education system. 87% of trainee mechanics work in the world of competition on completion of their training.

Since 2005, the Academy offers a new training center dedicated to the profession of instructor, with official recognition by a "Brevet Professionnel" (certificate of vocational competency).

Former graduates include Sébastien Bourdais, Franck Montagny, Stéphane Sarrazin, Narain Karthikeyan, Pierre Gasly, Anthoine Hubert, Jules Bianchi, Theo Pourchaire, and Ryo Fukuda.

It was renamed Auto Sport Academy in 2007, and then FFSA Academy in 2016.

Current drivers

French F4 Championship 
The Academy currently governs the French F4 Championship and supports their drivers. They are:

Other 
Other drivers supported by the FFSA currently are:

References

External links

Racing schools
TotalEnergies
French Formula 3 teams
British Formula Three teams
FIA Sportscar Championship entrants
24 Hours of Le Mans teams